The Originals is the twentieth studio album by American country music group The Statler Brothers. It was released in 1979 via Mercury Records. The album peaked at number 8 on the Billboard Top Country Albums chart.

Track listing
"How to Be a Country Star" (Don Reid, Harold Reid) – 3:26
"When the Yankees Come Home" (D. Reid) – 3:23
"Here We Are Again" (D. Reid) – 2:45
"Where He Always Wanted to Be" (D. Reid, H. Reid) – 2:50
"Mr Autry" (D. Reid, H. Reid) – 3:05
"Nothing as Original as You" (D. Reid) – 2:21
"Counting My Memories" (Kim Reid) – 2:40
"Little Farther Down the Road" (Lew DeWitt) – 2:32
"Just a Little Talk with Jesus" (Cleavant Derricks) – 2:30
"Almost in Love" (D. Reid, H. Reid) – 2:45
"The Star-Spangled Banner" (Francis Scott Key) - 1:43

Chart performance

References

1979 albums
The Statler Brothers albums
Mercury Records albums
Albums produced by Jerry Kennedy